Arnór Guðjohnsen (born 30 April 1961) is an Icelandic former footballer who played as a striker. He spent seven years with Belgian club Anderlecht and was the top scorer in the 1986–87 season. He is the father of striker Eiður Guðjohnsen and the grandfather of striker Sveinn Aron Guðjohnsen. His younger son, also named Arnór, signed for Swansea City in July 2017, at the age of 16.

Club career
Starting his career at Víkingur in Iceland, Arnór also played for Valur & Stjarnan, K.S.C. Lokeren Oost-Vlaanderen & R.S.C. Anderlecht in Belgium, FC Girondins de Bordeaux in France, BK Häcken & Örebro SK in Sweden.

Arnór took the final penalty of the 1984 UEFA Cup Final shootout which was saved by Tottenham's Tony Parks.

International career
He is the father and agent of striker Eiður Guðjohnsen. Arnór and Eiður are the only father and son to play for a national football team during the same game, in a match on 24 April 1996 in which Iceland beat Estonia 3–0 in Tallinn. Arnór was 34 and Eiður was 17 at the time. Eiður came on as a second-half substitute for his father, so they never actually played together.

At 25 he had been asked his biggest wish, to which he replied "to play international football alongside Eiður". However, shortly before a match in Reykjavik in which father and son were scheduled to appear alongside one another, Eiður broke his ankle in an Under-18 tournament. He missed the next two seasons, in which time Arnór retired from football. Arnór later said "It remains my biggest regret that we didn't get to play together, and I know it's Eiður's too".

Arnór played 73 games for the Icelandic national team and scored 14 goals, four of them in a game against Turkey. He played his last international in October 1997 against Liechtenstein.

Career statistics

Iceland score listed first, score column indicates score after each Arnór goal.

Honours

Club 

RSC Anderlecht Belgian First Division: 1984–85, 1985–86, 1986–87
 Belgian Cup: 1987–88, 1988–89
 Belgian Super Cup: 1985, 1987
 UEFA Cup runner-up: 1983–84
 European Cup Winners' Cup runner-up: 1989–90Girondins de Bordeaux Ligue 2: 1991–92

 Individual 
 Belgian First Division top scorer: 1986–87 (19 goals)'''
 Man of the Season (Belgian First Division): 1986–87

References

External links

1961 births
Living people
Arnor Gudjohnsen
Arnor Gudjohnsen
Arnor Gudjohnsen
Arnor Gudjohnsen
Arnor Gudjohnsen
Arnor Gudjohnsen
Belgian Pro League players
K.S.C. Lokeren Oost-Vlaanderen players
R.S.C. Anderlecht players
FC Girondins de Bordeaux players
BK Häcken players
Örebro SK players
Arnor Gudjohnsen
Ligue 1 players
Allsvenskan players
Expatriate footballers in Belgium
Expatriate footballers in France
Expatriate footballers in Sweden
Arnor Gudjohnsen
Arnor Gudjohnsen
Association football forwards
Guðjohnsen family